David Falconer, 3rd Lord Falconer of Halkerton (c. 1668 - February 1724) was a Scottish peer.

Biography
He was son of Alexander Falconer, 2nd Lord Falconer of Halkerton, and wife Margaret Ogilvie.

He was the 3rd Lord Falconer of Halkerton from 1684.

He died at the age of about 56 years, unmarried and without issue.

1668 births
1724 deaths